The Wadi Mukattab (Arabic for "Valley of Writing"), also known as the Valley of Inscriptions, is a wadi on Egypt's Sinai Peninsula near St Catherine's Monastery. It links the main road in the Wadi Feiran with the Wadi Maghareh's ancient turquoise mining area. The wadi is named after its valley's many petroglyphs. Nabataean  and Greek  inscriptions are abundant.

See also
Georgian graffiti of Nazareth and Sinai 
 Rivers of Egypt
 Biblical Sinai

References

Citations

Bibliography
  
 .
 .



Mukattab
Mukattab